Rahjerd may refer to:

Rahjerd, Hamadan
Rahjerd, Qom